IGU can stand for:

 Foz do Iguaçu International Airport (IATA airport code)
 Indian Golf Union
 Insulated Glazing Unit
 International Gas Union
 International Geographical Union